Robert Toupin (born January 20, 1949) is a Canadian former politician. Toupin served as a Member of Parliament in the House of Commons.

Toupin had been a worker for the Quebec Liberal Party when he joined the Progressive Conservative Party of Canada following Brian Mulroney's election as party leader. Toupin was a successful Tory candidate in Terrebonne riding in the 1984 federal election.

He was critical of the new government's policies and soon crossed the floor to sit as an Independent. He had attempted to join the Liberal Party of Canada but the Liberal riding association for the constituency he represented rejected him. He subsequently joined the New Democratic Party, becoming the first NDP Member of Parliament (MP) from a Quebec riding.  However, he left the party after ten months to again sit as an Independent, after claiming that communists had infiltrated the party. He was then invited to join the Rhinoceros Party of Canada.

Toupin was defeated as an independent candidate in the 1988 federal election.

Electoral record

References

External links
 

1949 births
Lawyers in Quebec
Independent MPs in the Canadian House of Commons
Progressive Conservative Party of Canada MPs
New Democratic Party MPs
Living people
People from Lanaudière
Members of the House of Commons of Canada from Quebec